Newberry is a town in Cass Township, Greene County, Indiana, United States. The population was 193 at the 2010 census. It is part of the Bloomington, Indiana Metropolitan Statistical Area.

Geography
Newberry is located at  (38.923752, -87.018930).

Climate
The climate in this area is characterized by hot, humid summers and generally mild to cool winters.  According to the Köppen Climate Classification system, Newberry has a humid subtropical climate, abbreviated "Cfa" on climate maps.

Demographics

2010 census
As of the census of 2010, there were 193 people, 81 households, and 51 families living in the town. The racial makeup of the town was 97.9% White, 1.0% Native American, 0.5% Pacific Islander, and 0.5% from other races. Hispanic or Latino of any race were 2.6% of the population.

There were 81 households, of which 24.7% had children under the age of 18 living with them, 53.1% were married couples living together, 3.7% had a female householder with no husband present, 6.2% had a male householder with no wife present, and 37.0% were non-families. 32.1% of all households were made up of individuals, and 8.6% had someone living alone who was 65 years of age or older. The average household size was 2.38 and the average family size was 2.96.

The median age in the town was 47.8 years. 20.7% of residents were under the age of 18; 4.6% were between the ages of 18 and 24; 22.2% were from 25 to 44; 34.8% were from 45 to 64; and 17.6% were 65 years of age or older. The gender makeup of the town was 49.2% male and 50.8% female.

2000 census
As of the census of 2000, there were 206 people, 93 households, and 59 families living in the town. The racial makeup of the town was 98.54% White, 0.49% African American, and 0.97% from two or more races. Hispanic or Latino of any race were 0.49% of the population.

There were 93 households, out of which 30.1% had children under the age of 18 living with them, 52.7% were married couples living together, 6.5% had a female householder with no husband present, and 35.5% were non-families. 35.5% of all households were made up of individuals, and 19.4% had someone living alone who was 65 years of age or older. The average household size was 2.22 and the average family size was 2.82.

In the town, the population was spread out, with 21.4% under the age of 18, 7.3% from 18 to 24, 25.2% from 25 to 44, 30.1% from 45 to 64, and 16.0% who were 65 years of age or older. The median age was 42 years. For every 100 females, there were 98.1 males. For every 100 females age 18 and over, there were 88.4 males.

The median income for a household in the town was $36,964, and the median income for a family was $45,833. Males had a median income of $32,321 versus $22,031 for females. The per capita income for the town was $18,313. About 6.3% of families and 12.9% of the population were below the poverty line, including 10.3% of those under the age of eighteen and 25.9% of those 65 or over.

References

External links
 White River Valley School Corporation
 Greene County Daily World Newspaper
 Greene County Economic Development Corporation

Towns in Greene County, Indiana
Towns in Indiana
Bloomington metropolitan area, Indiana